Mushroom sauce is a white or brown sauce prepared using mushrooms as its primary ingredient. It can be prepared in different styles using various ingredients, and is used to top a variety of foods.

Overview

In cooking, mushroom sauce is sauce with mushrooms as the primary ingredient. Often cream-based, it can be served with veal, chicken and poultry, pasta, and other foods such as vegetables. Some sources also suggest pairing mushroom sauce with fish.

It is made with mushrooms, butter, cream or olive oil, white wine (some variations may use a mellow red wine) and pepper with a wide variety of variations possible with additional ingredients such as shallot, garlic, lemon juice, flour (to thicken the sauce), chicken stock, saffron, basil, parsley, or other herbs. It is a variety of allemande sauce.

Mushroom sauce can also be prepared as a brown sauce. Canned mushrooms can be used to prepare the sauce.

For vegan dishes, cream can be replaced with ground almonds, mixed with water and evaporated until needed consistency.

History
Mushroom sauces have been cooked for hundreds of years.  An 1864 cookbook includes two recipes, one sauce tournee and one a brown gravy.

United States  President Dwight D. Eisenhower, a well-known steak lover, was reportedly quite fond of mushroom sauce.

Gallery

See also

 List of mushroom dishes
 List of sauces
 Mushroom gravy
 Mushroom ketchup

References

External links

 Wolfgang Puck's Pasta with Wild Mushroom Sauce at the Food Network

Sauces
Mushroom dishes